Phumulo Masualle is a South African politician. He was the Premier of the Eastern Cape province in South Africa, following his appointment in 2014. Masualle, member of the African National Congress (ANC) and SA Communist Party (SACP) stalwart, was one of the longest-serving executives in the provincial government.

Phumulo Masualle was born in Mount Fletcher in the Eastern Cape where he also grew up and studied at St Johns College in Mthatha.

References

Close Race For Eastern Cape Chair

African National Congress politicians
Premiers of the Eastern Cape
Living people
Year of birth missing (living people)
Members of the National Assembly of South Africa